The Borough of Runnymede is a local government district with borough status in the English county of Surrey. It is a very prosperous part of the London commuter belt, with some of the most expensive housing in the United Kingdom outside central London, such as the Wentworth Estate.

Runnymede is entirely unparished and is largely built-up. The borough's council is based in Addlestone; other settlements include Chertsey, Egham, Egham Hythe, Virginia Water, Englefield Green and Thorpe. At the 2011 Census, the population of the borough was 80,510.

The borough was formed in 1974 under the Local Government Act 1972 by the merger of the Chertsey and Egham Urban Districts, both of which had been created in 1894. It is named after Runnymede, a water meadow on the banks of the River Thames, near Egham. Runnymede is connected with the sealing of Magna Carta by King John in 1215 and is the site of several significant monuments.

Runnymede borders the boroughs of Spelthorne, Elmbridge, Woking and Surrey Heath, as well as the Royal Borough of Windsor and Maidenhead in Berkshire. The M25 motorway runs through Runnymede from south to north, with junctions at Chertsey and Egham, while train services in the borough are provided by South Western Railway on the Waterloo–Reading line and the Chertsey branch line.

Borough Council Committees
 Corporate Management Committee
 Environment and Sustainability Committee
 Housing Committee
 Standards and Audit Committee
 Overview and Scrutiny Select Committee
 Regulatory
 Planning Committee
 Licensing Committee and Sub-Committee
 Crime and Disorder Committee
 Community Services Committee
 Addlestone Leisure Centre JMC
 Chertsey Meads Management Liaison Group
 Cabrera Trust Management Committee
 External Appointments Sub-Committee 
The budgetary strategy and political agenda are set by The Leader and Deputy Leader of the Council.  The role of the Mayor of Runnymede is to chair full council meetings and perform ceremonial duties.

Councillors

Elections 

This Council has held elections by thirds (resulting in elections in May in three out of four years) since its inception. Most of its wards have three councillors.  Immediately before each election, a different councillor's seat from the others at ward level is legally vacant.

Political Composition

Premises
The council is based at Runnymede Civic Centre on Station Road in Addlestone. The new building cost a reported £12.6m and opened in May 2008. The council's former offices were on the adjoining site and were subsequently demolished to make way for a retail development.

Twinning
Runnymede is twinned with Bergisch Gladbach, situated 10 miles east of Cologne; Herndon, Virginia, about 20 miles west of Washington, D.C.; and Joinville-le-Pont, located to the east of Paris.

References

External links
Runnymede Borough Council

 
Local authorities adjoining the River Thames
Non-metropolitan districts of Surrey
Boroughs in England